The 1986–87 OHL season was the seventh season of the Ontario Hockey League. Fifteen teams each played 66 games. The Oshawa Generals won the J. Ross Robertson Cup, defeating the North Bay Centennials.

Regular season

Final standings
Note: GP = Games played; W = Wins; L = Losses; T = Ties; GF = Goals for; GA = Goals against; PTS = Points; x = clinched playoff berth; y = clinched division title;

Leyden Division

Emms Division

Scoring leaders

Playoffs

OHL Superseries
The winner of the OHL Superseries will host the 1987 Memorial Cup. This series featured the top ranked team in the Leyden Division, the Oshawa Generals, take on the top ranked team in the Emms Division, the North Bay Centennials.

(L1) Oshawa Generals vs. (E1) North Bay Centennials

Division quarter-finals

Leyden Division

(3) Ottawa 67's vs. (6) Cornwall Royals

(4) Kingston Canadians vs. (5) Belleville Bulls

Emms Division

(2) Hamilton Steelhawks vs. (6) Guelph Platers

(3) Windsor Compuware Spitfires vs. (5) Sault Ste. Marie Greyhounds

Division semi-finals

Leyden Division

(1) Oshawa Generals vs. (4) Kingston Canadians

(2) Peterborough Petes vs. (3) Ottawa 67's

Emms Division

(1) North Bay Centennials vs. (4) Kitchener Rangers

(2) Hamilton Steelhawks vs. (3) Windsor Spitfires

Division finals

Leyden Division

(1) Oshawa Generals vs. (2) Peterborough Petes

Emms Division

(1) North Bay Centennials vs. (3) Windsor Compuware Spitfires

J. Ross Robertson Cup

(L1) Oshawa Generals vs. (E1) North Bay Centennials

Awards

1987 OHL Priority Selection
The Sudbury Wolves held the first overall pick in the 1987 Ontario Priority Selection and selected John Uniac from the Stratford Cullitons. Uniac was awarded the Jack Ferguson Award, awarded to the top pick in the draft.

Below are the players who were selected in the first round of the 1987 Ontario Hockey League Priority Selection.

See also
List of OHA Junior A standings
List of OHL seasons
1987 Memorial Cup
1987 NHL Entry Draft
1986 in sports
1987 in sports

References

HockeyDB

Ontario Hockey League seasons
OHL